The Israel Catholic Scouts Association was founded in 1951 from five Scout groups established since 1926. Today, the organization consists of 18 Scout groups which belong to the Greek Catholic, Latin, and Maronite creeds. Three archbishops are Co-Presidents of the organization.

As of 2011, the Catholic Scouts maintain a membership of approximately 2,500, ages 7 to 18 and 800 volunteer leaders. They are aligned to the Arab and Druze Scouts Movement.

See also
 Palestinian Scout Association

References

External links 
 Catholic Scout Association in Israel

Scouting and Guiding in Israel
World Association of Girl Guides and Girl Scouts member organizations
World Organization of the Scout Movement member organizations
Catholic youth organizations
Child-related organizations in Israel
1951 establishments in Israel